Zach Blas is an artist and writer based in London. His work engages technology and politics and has been exhibited internationally at venues including IMA Brisbane; Museo Universitario Arte Contemporáneo, Mexico City; Whitechapel Gallery, London; and ZKM Center for Art and Media Karlsruhe. Currently, Blas is a lecturer in the department of Visual Cultures at Goldsmiths.

In 2014, Hito Steyerl listed Blas as a "FutureGreat" in ArtReview, writing, "While a lot of contemporary technologically oriented art tries to resuscitate the wreckage of Futurism, or overidentifies with strategies of surgical marketing and apple polishing, Blas’s work insists that one doesn’t need to brand oneself into voluntary servitude or to eagerly identify with the aggressor."

Education
Blas earned a BS in film and philosophy from Boston University and then a post-baccalaureate certificate from the School of the Art Institute of Chicago. Blas earned his MFA from the Design|Media Arts department at the University of California, Los Angeles and his Ph.D from the Program in Literature at Duke University in 2014.

In 2014-15, Blas was an assistant professor in the department of art at the University at Buffalo. His academic writing has appeared in publications including Camera Obscura, and Women's Studies Quarterly.

Selected projects

Contra-Internet
In 2014, Blas published the essay "Contra-Internet aesthetics in the book You Are Here: Art After the Internet , edited by curator Omar Kholeif. Composed of video, sculptures, performative lectures, Contra-Internet explores alternatives to the corporate and state-controlled internet, particularly in light of internet censorship during protest movements in the Arab Spring. Rhizome Artistic Director Michael Connor has written that the project imagines "alternatives to the neoliberal internet we know today. The project isn't an argument for unplugging, exactly; more for building or dreaming up alternative infrastructures."

In 2016, Blas wrote a text for e-flux journal titled "Contra-Internet." Blas has done lectured on the project at the IMA Brisbane, the Rhode Island School of Design Museum, and Whitechapel Gallery. In 2016, he received a Creative Capital grant in the Emerging Fields category for the project.

Facial Weaponization Suite
Facial Weaponization Suite (2011–14) explores discriminatory practices latent in biometric facial recognition systems. Composed of film and videos, the project emerged from community workshops Blas conducted where he scanned the faces of the participants and aggregated the data into a plastic mask designed to resist recognition by biometric systems. The first entry in the project, Fag Face Mask - October 20, 2012, Los Angeles, was made in Los Angeles using the facial data of gay men's faces. Curator Lauren Cornell has written that "Blas’ project seems to fight directly against the way subversive politics or lifestyles become quickly co-opted and drained of power, often to be sold back to broader society in neutered form. His aim is to carve a space where a community and ideas can form without the pressure and dangers of visibility."

The project has been exhibited internationally and written about in publications including Artforum, Frieze, Newsweek, The New York Times, the Walker Art Center, and WNYC.

References

Living people
American conceptual artists
Boston University alumni
School of the Art Institute of Chicago alumni
UCLA School of the Arts and Architecture alumni
Duke University alumni
Year of birth missing (living people)
University at Buffalo faculty